Alan or Allan Douglas may refer to:
 Alan Douglas (record producer) (1931–2014), American record producer
 Alan Douglas (journalist) (born 1951), Scottish journalist and former broadcaster
 Allan Douglas (cricketer, born 1958), Bermudian cricketer
 Allan Douglas (cricketer, born 1987), Bermudian cricketer